Following is a list of current and former courthouses of the United States federal court system located in Texas. Each entry indicates the name of the building along with an image, if available, its location and the jurisdiction it covers, the dates during which it was used for each such jurisdiction, and, if applicable the person for whom it was named, and the date of renaming. Dates of use will not necessarily correspond with the dates of construction or demolition of a building, as pre-existing structures may be adapted or court use, and former court buildings may later be put to other uses. Also, the official name of the building may be changed at some point after its use as a federal court building has been initiated.

Courthouses

Key

References

External links

United States District Court for the Eastern District of Texas divisional information
United States District Court for the Northern District of Texas divisional information
United States District Court for the Southern District of Texas divisional information
United States District Court for the Western District of Texas (divisional information is on the main page)
U.S. Courts court locator for Texas
U.S. Marshals Service Eastern District of Texas Courthouse Locations
U.S. Marshals Service Northern District of Texas Courthouse Locations
U.S. Marshals Service Southern District of Texas Courthouse Locations
U.S. Marshals Service Western District of Texas Courthouse Locations

Buildings of the United States government in Texas
Texas
Federal courthouses
Courthouses, federal